Fred Genesee is a Professor of psychology at McGill University.  He specializes in second language acquisition and bilingualism research.  In particular, his research examines the early stages of the acquisition of two languages in order to better understand this form of language acquisition and ascertain the neurocognitive limits of the child's ability to acquire language.  Specific topics Genesee has investigated in his research include language representation (lexical and syntactic) in early stages of bilingual acquisition, transfer in bilingual development, structural and functional characteristics of child bilingual code-mixing, and communication skills in young bilingual children.  In addition to this, Genesee has investigated in second language acquisition in school and the modalities for effective acquisition in school contexts.

Publications
 Paradis, J. and F. Genesee (1996). Syntactic acquisition in bilingual children: Autonomous or interdependent? SSLA, 18, 1-25.

References

External links
Fred Genesee's Homepage
Faculty Bio
Dr. Fred Genesee, Second Language Acquisition Expert Discusses Bilingualism
CARLA 2004 Immersion Conference--Fred Genesee, Keynote Speaker

Year of birth missing (living people)
Living people
Canadian psychologists
Academic staff of McGill University
Bilingualism and second-language acquisition researchers